Matthew Dinham (born 9 April 2000) is an Australian cyclist, who currently rides for UCI WorldTeam .

Major results

Road

2021
 8th Overall Tour de Bretagne
 8th Lillehammer GP
2022
 1st La Maurienne Classic
 National Under-23 Road Championships
2nd Road race
2nd Time trial
 5th Time trial, Oceania Under-23 Road Championships
 5th Overall Tour de la Mirabelle
 6th Road race, Oceania Road Championships
 7th Road race, UCI Road World Under-23 Championships
 7th Overall Tour du Pays de Montbéliard
 9th Overall Tour Alsace

Mountain Bike
2017
 2nd  Cross-country, Oceanian Junior Championships
2018
 2nd  Cross-country, Oceanian Junior Championships
2019
 1st  Cross-country, Oceanian Under-23 Championships
2020
 3rd  Cross-country, Oceanian Under-23 Championships
2022
 1st  Cross-country, National Championships

References

External links

2000 births
Living people
Australian male cyclists
Cyclists from Sydney